Tigra is a fictional character in Marvel Comics.

Tigra  may also refer to:

 Tigra, a fictional character in DC Comics.
 Tigra (gaon), a village in Gurgaon, Haryana, India
 Tigra Dam, on the Sank River, near Gwalior, Madhya Pradesh, India
 Tigra (cycling team), a Swiss cycling team 1950–1969
 Opel Tigra (also Vauxhall Tigra, Holden Tigra, and Chevrolet Tigra), a motor car 
 Lady Tigra, of the hip-hop duo L'Trimm

See also 
 La Tigra (disambiguation)
 Tigre (disambiguation)
 Tiger (disambiguation)
 Tigar (disambiguation)
 Tigrayans, an ethnic group in Eritrea and Ethiopia
 Tygra, a character from ThunderCats